The TSS Earnslaw is a 1912 Edwardian twin screw steamer based at Lake Wakatipu in New Zealand. It is one of the oldest tourist attractions in Central Otago, and the only remaining commercial passenger-carrying coal-fired steamship in the southern hemisphere.

History

At the beginning of the twentieth century, New Zealand Railways (NZR) awarded a £20,850-pound contract to John McGregor and Company shipbuilders of Dunedin to build a steamship for Lake Wakatipu at their Otago foundry and engineering works.  The Earnslaw was designed by naval architect Hugh McRae and was based on a Siemens-Martin steel hull design and using Kauri for the decking. Propulsion was provided by twin coal-fired triple-expansion, jet-condensing, vertically inclined engines. The keel was laid on 4 July 1911. The ship was named after Mount Earnslaw, a 2889-metre peak at the head of Lake Wakatipu. She was to be 51.2 metres long, the biggest boat on the lake, and the largest steamship built in New Zealand. Transporting the Earnslaw  was no easy task. When construction was finally completed, she was dismantled. All the quarter-inch steel hull plates were numbered for reconstruction much like a jig-saw puzzle. Then the parts were loaded on to a goods train and transported across the South Island from Dunedin to Kingston at the southern end of Lake Wakatipu.

After the hull was re-assembled, the TSS Earnslaw was launched on 24 February 1912.  On 3 August, after the construction of the ship was fully completed, trials were commenced.  On Friday 18 August 1912, the Earnslaw was fired up for her maiden voyage to Queenstown, with Minister of Marine John A. Millar as captain.

She then became a valuable vessel for NZR and was known as the "Lady of the Lake".

The Earnslaw worked with her sister ships, the paddle steamers Antrim and Mountaineer and the screw steamer Ben Lomond, transporting sheep, cattle and passengers to the surrounding high country stations.

In 1968, the Earnslaw was very nearly scrapped but she was fortunately rescued. She was leased by Fiordland Travel (subsequently Real Journeys, and then RealNZ) in 1969, and later purchased by the same company in 1982. She was taken out of service for a major refit in 1984. Her 12-metre high funnel was painted bright red, with the hull a snow-white, and her kauri timber decks glassed in.

During her long years on the lake, the most serious accidents to occur were two groundings on the shingle shores of the lake.

In 1984, the composer Ron Goodwin created a New Zealand Suite of six pieces recording his impressions of places he had visited.  One of these is the “Earnslaw Steam Theme” based on the rhythm of the ship's engines, which he wrote after a trip to Lake Wakatipu.

In March 1990, Queen Elizabeth II and Prince Philip travelled on the Earnslaw. Other royalty who have been on board include the Prince of Thailand  and the King and Queen of Belgium.

The TSS Earnslaw made a brief appearance as an Amazon River boat in the movie Indiana Jones and the Kingdom of the Crystal Skull (2008).

In June 2021, a report into greenhouse gas emissions in Otago calculated that in the 12 month period July 2018 to June 2019, the TSS Earnslaw emitted 4076 tonnes of 'carbon dioxide-equivalent'.  This represented 1 percent of all transport-related greenhouse gas emissions in the Queenstown-Lakes District.  In October 2021, RealNZ announced that it was investigating carbon-neutral or carbon-zero means of powering the vessel. At a celebration in 2022 of TSS Earnslaw completing 110 years of service on the lake, RealNZ said that it was exploring biofuel, wood pellets and hydrogen as alternative sources of bolier fuel, but that a decision was a few years away.

Heritage status

A detailed history of the Earnslaw including archival photographs has been published in the NZ Maritime Record maintained by the NZ National Maritime Museum.

In 1990, the TSS Earnslaw was recognised as a significant part of New Zealand's engineering heritage by the Institution of Professional Engineers New Zealand (now Engineering New Zealand). The recognition was part of the “Engineering to 1990” project celebrating the country’s sesquicentenary in 1990. A plaque was fixed to the vessel to that reads: "IPENZ recognises this engineering work as an important part of NZ's engineering heritage. The largest steamship built in NZ it is now one of the world’s last coal-fired passenger steamers".

In July 2013, the Southern Heritage Trust unveiled a plaque on the Dunedin Railway Station overbridge commemorating the location of the McGregor & Co factory where TSS Earnslaw was built.

In December 2017, the New Zealand Ministry for Culture and Heritage recognized the TSS Earnslaw as one of twelve significant sites in Otago to be included in its Landmarks Whenua Tohunga programme.

The Earnslaw is winched out of the lake on a cradle when major surveys are required.  There is a historic slipway for this purpose at the south west corner of the Frankton arm of Lake Wakatipu.  The slipway is equipped with a steam engine driven winch.  The boiler and steam engine used to power the winch were originally in service on Lake Wakatipu in the paddle steamer Antrim, originally launched in 1869.  The Antrim was dismantled from 1920, but the boiler and engine were recovered for use on the slipway.  The Antrim engine is recognised as a significant part of New Zealand's engineering heritage.

Current status

The Earnslaw celebrated her centenary in October 2012 and continues in routine operation carrying tourist passengers across Lake Wakatipu from Queenstown to Walter Peak High Country Farm, a tourism operation with farm tours, horse treks, heritage tours, barbecue lunches and evening dining at the historic Colonel's Homestead.

The ship works fourteen-hour days in the summer months and cruises for eleven months of the year, despite being over 100 years old. Visitors to the region can undertake a 1.5-hour cruise on board the TSS Earnslaw and view the workings of the steam engine and stokers.

Each year, the TSS Earnslaw undergoes an annual survey – typically from late May to early June – with every second year being taken out of the lake.

Passengers have access to a walkway in the engine room, where they can observe the operation of the engines during the cruise.

Captains
The ship's captains include the following:
 George Herbert (Captain 1935)
 Tom Luckie (NZR Captain 19?? - 1952)
 Alexander Munro (NZR Captain 1952 - 1955)
 Patrick Bennetts (NZR Captain 1955 - 1964 - he was on the crew for 30 years)
 Patrick R. McSoriley (NZR Captain 1964 - 1968 - he first joined the crew in 1941)
 Sandy McLean (Captain 1968 - 1969)
 Maru Bradshaw (Captain 1969 - 1991)

Gallery

References

Bibliography 
 Malcolm Mackay, Lady of the Lake: The TSS Earnslaw Story, Malcolm Mackay, Queenstown, 1999.
 Jenny McLeod, TSS Earnslaw : celebrating 100 years, 1912-2012,  Te Anau, N.Z.: Real Journeys, 2012.  .

External links

 NZ National Maritime Museum record
 15 facts you didn't know about the TSS Earnslaw

Ships built in New Zealand
Ships of New Zealand
Ferries of New Zealand
Steamships of New Zealand
1912 ships
Queenstown, New Zealand
Tourist attractions in Otago